Goethals Memorial School is an English-medium boarding school run by the Congregation of Christian Brothers in the town of Kurseong, Darjeeling, India. It is set in a forest 5 km (3 miles) from Kurseong between Siliguri and Darjeeling at an altitude of 1673.854 meters (5491 feet) above sea level. 

The school was founded in 1907 and is named after the Jesuit Archbishop of Calcutta (now Kolkata), Paul Goethals. The land for the school was donated by the Maharaja of Bardhaman. Goethals has always been regarded as one of the best schools in India. The school was previously all boys but the introduction of higher secondary section led to the introduction of girls in the school. Now the school is co-ed even in the secondary section. The school is known to induce patriotism in the hearts of the students who have studied and left this school. It has special student leaders called prefects who are elected by the concerned authorities at the start of the academic session. They are given special blue coloured sweaters and coats which are a shade brighter than the rest of the students.

School anthem 
The school anthem is "Cheers for Goethals".

School ranking 
Goethals Memorial is rated 4.6 out of 5 on the School My Kids school rating and reviews website.

Goethals Memorial School is ranked 398th out of 1914 CISCE Schools in India by Best Schools in India.

References

External links 
 Goethals Memorial School

Congregation of Christian Brothers secondary schools
Catholic schools in India
Boys' schools in India
Christian schools in West Bengal
Primary schools in West Bengal
High schools and secondary schools in West Bengal
Boarding schools in West Bengal
Schools in Darjeeling district
Educational institutions established in 1907
1907 establishments in India